The Chennakeshava temple, dedicated to the Hindu god Vishnu is located in the village of Hullekere, in the Arasikere Taluk, about 22 km from the commercial town Arasikere. It was built in 1163 A.D. by a minister of Hoysala empire king Narasimha I. The art historian Adam Hardy categorizes the architectural style as a single shrine (vimana) construction with miniature vimanas, the basic building material being Soap stone. The monument is protected by the Karnataka state division of Archaeological Survey of India.

Temple plan
The temple has all the basic features of a Hoysala era construction. According to art historian Gerard Foekema, being a single vimana (cella or shrine) construction it qualifies as a ekakuta plan (a tower called shikhara over the shrine). The entrance to the temple is through an open pillared hall or porch (mukhamantapa) followed by a closed hall (mantapa or navaranga). The porch consists of an awning supported by half pillars and parapets on either side. The decor on the parapet walls, ceiling, lintel over the entrance and the pillars is noteworthy. The inner walls of the shrine is square and plain where as the outer walls (also square) have numerous recesses and projections that is used for decorative relief which includes Kirtimukha, Aedicula (miniature decorative towers), deities in relief and half pilasters. The closed hall connects to the sanctum via a vestibule (called sukhanasi). The vestibule also as a tower that looks like a low protrusion of the tower over the shrine. The ceiling of the compact closed hall is supported by four lathe turned pillars that divide the ceiling into nine tastefully decorated bays.

At the top of the main tower is the kalasha, a decorative water-pot like structure which stands on a large ornate dome. This dome is the largest piece of sculpture in the temple and can be 2m x 2m in size. On the tower over the vestibule (also called sukhanasi, Foekema calls it the "nose") is located the Hoysala emblem of a royal warrior (legend has it that it is Sala, the founder of the empire) stabbing a lion. The design of the tower, according to art historian Percy Brown, is a characteristic feature to the Hoysala art. According to Brown, the decorative details in the wall of the shrine is carried through the tower. The tower is divided into decorative tiers with each tier diminishing in height and culminating in an "umbrella" like structure. Brown also claims the lathe turned pillars with four brackets above are a signature style of the 11th-13th century Chalukya-Hoysala architectural idiom.

Notes

References
 Gerard Foekema, A Complete Guide to Hoysala Temples, Abhinav, 1996, New Delhi, 
 

 Adam Hardy, Indian Temple Architecture: Form and Transformation : the Karṇāṭa Drāviḍa Tradition, 7th to 13th Centuries, Abhinav, 1995, New Delhi, .

Gallery

Hindu temples in Hassan district
12th-century Hindu temples